Pearse Piggott (born 1961) is an Irish former hurler who played as a midfielder for the Galway senior team.

Piggott joined the team during the 1980-81 National League and was a regular member of the team for much of the next decade. During that time he won one National Hurling League winners' medal on the field of play as well as back-to-back All-Ireland winners' medals as a non-playing substitute.

At club level Piggott is a two-time Connacht medalist with Gort. In addition to this he has also won two county club championship medals.

References

1961 births
Living people
Gort hurlers
Galway inter-county hurlers
Connacht inter-provincial hurlers